Intracellular calcium-sensing proteins are proteins that act in the second messenger system.

Examples include:
 calmodulin
 calnexin
 calreticulin
 gelsolin

References

External links
 

Human proteins